The Muhammad Mosque is a mosque in Hamilton, Bermuda.

History
The mosque was established in 1975.

Architecture
The mosque is located in a building which consists of the main prayer hall, school, imam's office and the community center. The building consists of four floors. The total floor area of the building is 669 m2 on a land area of 3,772 m2.

See also
 Islam in Bermuda

References

External links

 

1975 establishments in Bermuda
Buildings and structures in Hamilton, Bermuda
Mosques completed in 1975
Religious buildings and structures in Bermuda
Islam in Bermuda